Epithemia is a genus of diatoms belonging to the family Rhopalodiaceae.

The genus has cosmopolitan distribution.

They have recently been linked to nitrogen fixation and can be a possible indicator of eutrophication. This is because levels of epithemia “containing cyanobacteria endosymbionts, decreased with increased ambient inorganic N concentrations” (Stancheva 2013). Concentrations of members of the epithemia genus existing with cyanobacteria endosymbionts would mean that there is more fixed nitrogen in the ecosystem. It could act as an early indicator of nutrient overload.

Species

Species:

Epithemia alpestris 
Epithemia alpestris 
Epithemia anasthasiae

References

Diatoms
Diatom genera